Lufthansa Italia S.p.A. was an Italian airline and a wholly owned subsidiary of the German Lufthansa Group headquartered in Milan and based at Milan–Malpensa Airport. Operations started on 2 February 2009 and ceased on 29 October 2011.

History

Foundation
On 28 April 2008 Lufthansa announced plans to commence intra-European flights out of Milan–Malpensa Airport using six Embraer 195 aircraft from its subsidiary Air Dolomiti.
On 26 November 2008 the new brand Lufthansa Italia was formed instead of the originally planned Air Dolomiti operations. Operations started on 2 February 2009 using the larger Airbus A319-100. The new subsidiary was established to allow Lufthansa to better tap into the lucrative North Italian market that was all but abandoned by Alitalia during a series of cutbacks. The airline's on board cuisine was aimed towards the Italian market, with Italian foods and drinks. For example, in business class, Italian espresso was served.

Shutdown
On 23 July 2011, Lufthansa reported in a press release that it would stop all Lufthansa Italia operations by 29 October 2011 as it had been proven too difficult to operate the Italian-based operations economically. As a replacement, the Lufthansa Group increased their flights from Italian destinations to their German hubs in Frankfurt and Munich instead. The last scheduled flight of Lufthansa Italia was LH3627 on 29 October 2011, which landed at 16:35, coming from Palermo to Milan-Malpensa, which was flown on the Airbus A319-100 with the registration D-AKNJ. The former Lufthansa Italia aircraft have been transferred back to other Lufthansa Group airlines.

Destinations 

The following cities were served by Lufthansa Italia prior to its shutdown on 29 October 2011:

Fleet

The Lufthansa Italia fleet consisted of the following aircraft:

Five of the airline's aircraft came from Lufthansa subsidiary Germanwings, and the other five came from Lufthansa's base at Munich. All aircraft were given names of Italian cities, such as 'Bologna' and 'Varese', and were painted in a modified Lufthansa livery. The aircraft retained their German registrations. In 2010, the airline planned to replace one A319 with two Airbus A320, but this never occurred. Two of the five daily flights to London were operated by a British Midland International Airbus A321 in a 31/118 configuration.

References

External links

 
 - German version, Italian version linked from English page

Lufthansa
Defunct airlines of Italy
Airlines established in 2008
Airlines disestablished in 2011
Italian companies established in 2008
2011 disestablishments in Italy
Former Star Alliance affiliate members